The 1991–92 FA Trophy was the twenty-third season of the FA Trophy.

First qualifying round
The matches (no including replays) were played on September 21, 1991.

Ties

Replays

2nd replay

Second qualifying round
The matches (no including replays) were played on October 19, 1991.

Ties

Replays

Third qualifying round
The matches (no including replays) were played on November 30, 1991.

Ties

Replays

1st round
The teams that given byes to this round are Wycombe Wanderers, Colchester United, Altrincham, Kettering Town, Telford United, Macclesfield Town, Runcorn, Merthyr Tydfil, Barrow, Welling United, Northwich Victoria, Kidderminster Harriers, Yeovil Town, Stafford Rangers, Cheltenham Town, Gateshead, Bath City, Farnborough Town, Witton Albion, Redbridge Forest, Aylesbury United, Dartford, Woking, Dover Athletic, Hyde United, Leek Town, Gretna, Gloucester City, Stalybridge Celtic, Enfield, Wivenhoe Town and Guisborough Town. The matches (no including replays) were played on January 11, 1992.

Ties

Replays

2nd round
The matches (no including replays) were played on February 1, 1992.

Ties

Replays

3rd round
The matches (no including replays) were played on February 22, 1992.

Ties

Replays

4th round
The matches (no including replays) were played on March 14, 1992.

Ties

Replays

Semi finals
The first legs were played on April 4, 1992, and the second legs were played on April 10–11, 1992.

First leg

Second leg

Final
The match was played on May 10, 1992.

Tie

References

General
 Football Club History Database: FA Trophy 1991–92

Specific

1991–92 domestic association football cups
League
1991–92